Jonathan Clarke (August 12, 1705 - 1770) was an American silversmith active in Newport and Providence, Rhode Island.

Clarke was born in Newport, Rhode Island, where from 1734-1755 he worked as a silversmith. There he served in the militia as Ensign in 1735 and Captain in 1742, and in 1750 was appointed Justice of Peace. From about 1755-1766 he was active as a silversmith in Providence, Rhode Island. His work is collected in the Metropolitan Museum of Art, Rhode Island School of Design Museum, Winterthur Museum, and Yale University Art Gallery.

References 
 American Silversmiths and Their Marks: The Definitive (1948) Edition, Stephen Guernsey Cook Ensko, Courier Corporation, 1983, page 38.
 Early American Silver in The Metropolitan Museum of Art, Beth Carver Wees, Medill Higgins Harvey, Metropolitan Museum of Art, 2013, page 189.
 American silver at Winterthur, Ian M. G. Quimby, Dianne Johnson, Henry Francis du Pont Winterthur Museum, 1995, page 74.
 "Newport Town Records", in The Rhode Island Historical Magazine, Volume 1,Henry Edward Turner, Risbrough Hammett Tilley, Newport Historical Publishing Company, 1881, page 163.
 "Jonathan Clarke", American Silversmiths.
 "Jonathan Clarke", Silver Salon Forums.
 "Silversmiths: Clark to Coburn", Sterling Flatware Fashions.

American silversmiths
1705 births
1770 deaths